Hörður Björgvin Magnússon (born 11 February 1993) is an Icelandic professional footballer who plays as a centre-back for Super League Greece club Panathinaikos and the Iceland national team.

Club career

Early career
Born in Reykjavík, Iceland, Hörður began his career within the youth academy of Knattspyrnufélagið Fram in 1998. He remained within the youth academy until 2010, although he managed to appear in six first–team matches between the 2009 and 2010 campaigns, with his debut coming in a 3–1 away defeat to KR on 30 August 2009.

He remained with his local team until 2011, when he was transferred to Italian club Juventus.

Juventus
On 23 July 2011, Hörður officially transferred to Juventus where he was registered with the club's youth academy.
After spending the 2011–12 and 2012–13 seasons as an overage player with the Primavera (under-19) team, Hörður was promoted to the first-team squad ahead of the 2013–14 Serie A campaign.

Spezia
Initially part of Juventus’ first-team training camp, Hörður was soon transferred to Serie B side Spezia Calcio on a co-ownership agreement
completed on 5 August 2014 for €1 million.
He made his Serie B debut on 24 September 2013 in a 2–1 away win versus Ternana. He finished the season having made 20 league appearances for the side who finished in the final promotion play-off spot, although they failed to progress beyond the first post-season match following a 1–0 defeat away to Modena.

Cesena (loan)
In June 2014 Juventus bought back the 50% share of the player's contract that they had sold to Spezia one year earlier, for €1 million, and immediately loaned Hörður out to Serie A outfit A.C. Cesena on 23 July 2014.
On 31 August 2015, the loan was renewed.

Bristol City
On 13 July 2016, it was announced that Hörður had signed for Championship side Bristol City for an undisclosed fee, penning a three-year deal. He made his debut for the club on 6 August 2016 and scored City's first goal in a 2–1 come-from-behind win over Wigan Athletic. The goal was initially credited to Tammy Abraham although it was later decided that Hörður had scored instead.

Magnusson featured in every game as Bristol City reached the semi finals of the 2017–18 EFL Cup with wins over Premier League opponents Watford, Stoke City, Crystal Palace and Manchester United. Magnusson also played as City lost in the semi-final against Premier League leaders Manchester City.

CSKA Moscow
On 20 June 2018, Russian club CSKA Moscow announced that they had agreed on a transfer of Hörður with Bristol City, with personal terms still to be signed, while Bristol City announced that Hörður had left for an undisclosed fee. On 20 May 2022, CSKA announced that Hörður's contract will not be renewed after it expires at the end of the 2021–22 season.

Panathinaikos
On 9 July 2022, Hörður signed a two-year contract with Panathinaikos in Greece.

International career
Hörður was selected as part of the Iceland national team's 23-man squad for Euro 2016. Iceland impressed during the competition, before being knocked out by hosts France at the quarter-final stage. Hörður did not take part in any of Iceland's five matches.

On 28 March 2017, Hörður scored his first goal for Iceland in a 1–0 friendly international win against the Republic of Ireland at the Aviva Stadium. After their qualification for the 2018 FIFA World Cup, Magnússon was named by The Guardian as Iceland's "one to watch" for the tournament. In May 2018 he was named in Iceland's 23-man squad for the 2018 World Cup in Russia.

Career statistics

Club

International

Scores and results list Iceland's goal tally first, score column indicates score after each Hörður goal.

Honours

Club

CSKA Moscow
Russian Super Cup: 2018

International
Baltic Cup: 2022

References

External links

1993 births
Knattspyrnufélagið Fram players
A.C. Cesena players
Association football defenders
Bristol City F.C. players
English Football League players
Expatriate footballers in England
Expatriate footballers in Italy
Expatriate footballers in Russia
Expatriate footballers in Greece
Hordur Bjorgvin Magnusson
Hordur Bjorgvin Magnusson
Hordur Bjorgvin Magnusson
Hordur Bjorgvin Magnusson
Hordur Bjorgvin Magnusson
Hordur Bjorgvin Magnusson
Hordur Bjorgvin Magnusson
Hordur Bjorgvin Magnusson
Hordur Bjorgvin Magnusson
Juventus F.C. players
PFC CSKA Moscow players
Panathinaikos F.C. players
Living people
Serie A players
Serie B players
Russian Premier League players
Spezia Calcio players
Hordur Bjorgvin Magnusson
UEFA Euro 2016 players
Hordur Bjorgvin Magnusson
2018 FIFA World Cup players